Guhathakurta is a surname, a combination of Guha and Thakurta.

Notable people with the surname include:

 Guhathakurta family of Barisal, a British Raj era Zamindar family from Bengal Presidency
 Jyotirmoy Guhathakurta (1920–1971), Bengali educator and humanist
 Kamalika Guha Thakurta (fl. from 1998), Indian actress
 Madhulika Guhathakurta, American astrophysicist and scientist 
 Paranjoy Guha Thakurta (born 1955), Indian journalist
 Ruma Guha Thakurta (1934–2019), Indian singer and actress
 Runu Guha Thakurta (fl. 1951–53), Indian footballer
 Shreya Guhathakurta (born 1975), Indian Rabindra Sangeet singer
 Surup Guha Thakurta (born 1936), Indian cricketer
 Swami Paramananda (Suresh Chandra Guhathakurta, born 1884), teacher and philosopher
 Tapati Guha-Thakurta (born 1957), Indian historian

See also